Maryna Asauliuk (born October 18, 1980) is a Ukrainian-American fashion designer, stylist and art director. She is married, with two children.

Career 
Maryna Asauliuk is the creator of the most famous Ukrainian haute couture dress, made from thousands of ears of wheat. In this dress Hanna Poslavska, third vice-Miss Universe, represented Ukraine on the Miss Universe 2010 contest.

Formerly worked under the brand Moafashion, that produced annual fashion-calendar, where Ukrainian, Russian and European show business stars used to be as cloth demonstrators: Jamala, Kelly Joyce, Sergei Lazarev, Oleksandr Ponomariov, Andrii Kuzmenko, Olha Horbachiova, Philipp Kirkorov, Lama, Dasha Astafieva, Natalia Mohilevska, Potap, Nastya Kamenskykh, Ani Lorak, Olena Hrebeniuk, Asia Akhat, Loboda, Mika Newton, Lilia Podkopayeva, Nikolai Baskov, Yurii Nikitin, Viktor Pavlik, Anastasia Prikhodko, Vladyslav Yama, Olha Sumska, Viktor Broniuk, Tina Karol, Albina Dzhanabaeva, Ostap Stupka, Oleh Lisohor and Timur Rodriguez.

In 2006, opera singer Olha Hrebeniuk in a dress from Maryna Asauliuk wins the "Eurovideo Grand Prix 2006", the finals was held in the capital of Albania Tirana.

In 2007 Maryna Asauliuk represented three of her collections live at once under her own own-organized event KYIV MOA KYIV, that were dedicated to 1525th anniversary of Kyiv, Maryna's hometown.

In 2009 popular by that time girl-band Real O dedicated to Maryna Asauliuk their music video called "Platye" (English: Dress).

Maryna Asauliuk is an author of transparent little black dress for 55th Anniversary Playmate Dasha Astafieva on a 55th anniversary of Playboy party.

Since 2011, she releases a collection "Українцем бути модно" (from ukr. It is stylish to be Ukrainian) in which she actively uses elements of Ukrainian folk, folk art and graphical design of Cossacks from the artist Oleksii Chebykin. Shirts from Maryna Asauliuk with original Cossacks images were a hit of the season in Ukraine. Pirated copies can still be found selling in Kyiv and various markets across Ukraine.

From 2012 to 2016, she was working with her husband, a television producer Oleksandr Asaulyuk as a chief art director for numerous shows. In particular, the show Tuzik & Barbos, the world's first late-night show with dogs as host.

In the end of 2015 she's resumed her fashion activity as designer under her own brand ASAULIUK.

In 2017, Maryna Asauliuk was again selected to design the National Costume for the Miss Universe 2017 competition in Las Vegas, USA. Especially for this event, Maryna created the St. Sophia dress that named and dedicated in honor of the most ancient Ukrainian holy shrine of St. Sophia Cathedral of Kyiv. This costume's was designed in California, USA and production was carried out in Ukraine. The dress budget has exceeded 10 thousand dollars США. More than 20 high-top craftsmen were involved to the production of the dress. The famous Ukrainian embroidery was made with Swarovski crystals and the glass beads, and also specifically painted a picture of St. Sophia of Kyiv, which was then transferred to a cloth suit.

References 

 Марина Асаулюк: «Моя робота — це світська тусовка» 
 Miss Universe National Costumes Ukraine 
 Top 55 most revealing dresses on Red Carpet 
 "Міс Україна-Всесвіт-2010" повезе на конкурс хлібну сукню 
 Українка Ганна Пославська посіла четверте місце на конкурсі «Міс Всесвіт – 2010» 
 Национальный костюм, созданный Мариной Асаулюк из колосков пшеницы, вошел в ТОП-5 лучших  костюмов конкурса Miss Universe 2010 
 Платье из пшеницы от Украины на «Мисс Вселенная-2010»
 Келли Джойс получила платье от Марины Асаулюк 
 ШОКУЄМО КОЛОСКАМИ 
 Украинская певица и фотомодель Даша Астафьева стала лицом юбилейного номера американского журнала «плейбой»
 Кузьма примерил платье Кульбабы 
 Филипп Киркоров стал Богданом Хмельницким 
 НИКОЛАЙ БАСКОВ. УДИВИТЕЛЬНОЕ ПЕРЕВОПЛОЩЕНИЕ В ЖЕНЩИНУ.
 moa: moafashion calendar 
 MOAFASHION by Marina Asauliuk
 Над образами «Горячего Шоколада» работала Марина Асаулюк
 Moafahion 2011 
 Марина Асаулюк устроила экстрим Светлане Лободе и сделала казака из Потапа! 
 Марина Асаулюк/ Marina Asaulyuk Дос’є на зірок
 Марина Асаулюк: «Моя работа — это светская тусовка»
 Ассия Ахат сожгла платье возле Лысой горы
 Марина Асаулюк: «Все женщины достойны миллиона роз!» 
 MOA:FASHION CALENDAR 2010 
 Платье-сноп - это победа на «Мисс Вселенная» 
 Марина Асаулюк: Я могу создать невероятное, яркие наряды и быть уверена, что его увидит вся Украина
 Марина Асаулюк: Я могу создать невероятное, яркие наряды и быть уверена, что его увидит вся Украина №2
 Ассія Ахат вчинила наругу над "Dоlсе & Gabbana" заради нової лінії одягу

1980 births
Living people
Ukrainian emigrants to the United States
Ukrainian fashion designers
Ukrainian women fashion designers